Elaine Colima Duran-Pengson (born March 14, 1998) is a Filipino singer best known for being crowned as the third season grand champion of Tawag ng Tanghalan on the noon-time television show It's Showtime.

Life
Elaine Duran was born on March 14, 1998, in Butuan, province of Agusan del Norte, Philippines. She went to Agusan National High School and she studied Bachelor of Arts in Communication at the New Era University. Elaine's first appearance was at Wil Time Bigtime during the segment Willie of Fortune where she sang "Bukas Na Lang Kita Mamahalin".

Career

Tawag ng Tanghalan (2017–18) 
In 2017, auditioned for the second season of Tawag ng Tanghalan, but was not accepted. She auditioned again during Season 3 and received a confirmation to compete in the first quarter.

Daily Rounds
On September 7, 2018, Duran participated in the Season 3, Quarter I of Tawag ng Tanghalan on It's Showtime, a singing competition broadcast on ABS-CBN. She was dubbed as "Bida sa Galing ng Butuan City". She sang "Now That You're Gone" by Juris Fernandez where she won as the daily winner. On her last day as the defending champion, she sang her rendition of "When We Were Young" by Adele where emerged the first record holder, after successfully defending the golden microphone ten times.

Season 3, Quarter I – Semi-finals
On September 12, 2018, Duran entered the semi-finals for defending the golden microphone for 5 consecutive days. She became the fourth semi-finalist of the first quarter, also on the semi-finals are John Mark Digamon, Jophil Cece, Windimie Yntong and Ranillo Enriquez. The five semi-finalists competed during the week-long Semi-finals starting October 1, 2018. Elaine's performances received good comments standing ovation like her rendition of "Oo" by UDD. On the last day of the Semi-finals, she earned the highest combined score of 97.57% and advanced to the grand finals.

Season 3, Grand Finals
The twelve grand finalists performed in the week-long competition that took place on September 23–28, 2019 held at the Caloocan Sports Complex. During the first round of the Grand Finals, Duran performed Shanti Dope's Nadarang and advanced to the Top 3 , receiving a standing ovation. During the final round, she performed a Basil Valdez medley, which included the songs "Hanggang sa Dulo ng Walang Hanggan", "Sana ay Ikaw na Nga", "Ngayon at Kailanman". She emerged as the Tawag ng Tanghalan Season 3 Grand Champion.

Twitter and Youtube Videos
Duran's performance videos were quickly viral and top trending for several days. Some of her videos reached over 6 million views and the other videos have racked 2 million views.

At the end of the season, the topic Elaine Duran and Elaine were #3 and #7 trending worldwide on Twitter, while Nadarang, Grabe Elaine and Ellaine were #3 and #13 trending nationwide.

References 

1998 births
Filipino women pop singers
Tawag ng Tanghalan contestants
Living people
Filipino Roman Catholics
ABS-CBN personalities
21st-century Filipino women singers
Star Music artists